Aleksey Maratovich Orlov (Orlov Aleksey Maratoviç) is a Russian politician, who serves as Russian Federation Senator from Kalmykia since 2019. He previously served as Head of Kalmykia from 2010 to 2019.

Early life
Orlov was born on 9 October 1961 in Elista, the capital of Kalmykia, to an ethnic Kalmyk family.

In 1984, he graduated from the Moscow State Institute of International Relations of the MFA of the USSR.

Early career
From 1984 to 1985, Orlov worked as chief inspector of the association for the export of agrarian products "Selkhozprodexport", Moscow.
In 1986, he began work as a plumber at the Moscow plant "Agregat". In 1989, he became department manager, and later the head of the Trade-union center of the MFA service department. In 1991 he began to serve as Director General, Vice Manager of the Soviet-Yugoslav Joint Venture Company JSC "Sov-Yug" , a position which he held until 1994. From August 1994 to January 1995, he was Vice Manager at CJSC "Poisk". 
From February 1995 to July 1995 he worked as Director General of the Russian-Italian Joint Venture Company CJSC "MAG".

Political career
From 1995 to 2010, Orlov served in different roles as a liaison between the government of Kalmykia and the office of the President of Russia.
 
On September 21, 2010, Russian President Dmitry Medvedev nominated Orlov to be Head of Kalmykia from a list of four candidates proposed by his ruling United Russia Party. On 28 September he was confirmed by the republic's legislature, the People's Khural of Kalmykia. He took office the following month, succeeding Kirsan Ilyumzhinov. After Russia re-adopted direct popular elections for Governors, he announced his ultimately successful run for re-election in 2014.

References 
Justin Corfield - The History of Kalmykia: from Ancient times to Kirsan Ilyumzhinov and Aleksey Orlov (2015). . This book covers the history of Kalmykia and the Kalmyks, and draws on a long interview with Aleksey Orlov, and also with some of his friends and colleagues in Chapter 5: Aleksey Orlov and the continued development of Kalmykia.

External links
Biography Official Biography of Alexey Orlov, retrieved on August 27, 2011
'Медведев выдвинул на пост президента Калмыкии кремлевского чиновника' - Nomination and Biography of Alexey Orlov

1961 births
Living people
People from Elista
Kalmyk people
Moscow State Institute of International Relations alumni
Heads of Kalmykia
United Russia politicians
21st-century Russian politicians
Tibetan Buddhists from Russia
Members of the Federation Council of Russia (after 2000)